Cains & Abels is an American musical group originally from Grand Rapids, Michigan, and currently based in Chicago, Illinois. The band consists of David Sampson (vocals, bass guitar), Joshua Ippel (guitar), Jonathan Dawe (drums, vocals) and Michelle Vondiziano (keyboards, vocals). The band members met in 2003 while attending Calvin College.

In May 2009, Cains & Abels released Call Me Up on States Rights Records. In a Pitchfork Media list, the post-Afrobeat dance explosion band NOMO named it one of the best albums of 2008, though the album did not officially come out until 2009.

The MP3 blog Said the Gramophone listed Cains & Abels' 2009 single "My Life is Easy" in its Best Songs of 2009.

Discography

Studio albums
Call Me Up (May 2009) - States Rights Records
My Life is Easy (March 2012) - Whistler Records

EPs
Clean Air, Cloud Science (2005) - New Blood
The Price Is Right (2011) - Positive Beat Recordings .

Compilations
Grown Zone/Groan Zone (2007) - States Rights Records
Bro Zone (2005) - States Rights RecordsGrown Zone/Groan Zone

References

External links
Cains & Abel's official website
Facebook
MySpace
Muxtape
Rebecca Tirrell Talbot, "Cains & Abels Sing Their Heads Off", The Curator 

Musical groups from Michigan
2003 establishments in Michigan